Camillo Camilliani (fl. 1574–1603) was an Italian architect, military engineer and sculptor. He is mostly known for the design of watchtowers and other fortifications around the coasts of Sicily.

Life
 
Camillani was born in Florence sometime in the 16th century. He was the son of the sculptor Francesco Camilliani. In 1574, he and Michelangelo Naccherino directed the relocation of the Fontana Pretoria, which had been designed by his father, from Florence to Palermo.

In July 1583, Viceroy Marcantonio Colonna invited him to Sicily to design a system of coastal fortifications to prevent the island from being attacked by the Ottoman Empire or Barbary pirates. Camillani reviewed the existing fortifications, and in 1584 he published his findings in the report Descrittione delle marine di tutto il regno di Sicilia con le guardie necessarie da cavallo e da piedi che vi si tengono.

He went on to design watchtowers, which were built at strategic sites along the coastline, in such a way that they were able to communicate with each other and warn cities of any approaching enemy. The towers had a square base with two floors, and were armed with artillery pieces on the roof. 

Camillani also designed fountains, statues and funerary monuments for various patrons and churches.

Works
Camillani designed the following buildings, among others:

Fortifications
Fortezza del Tocco, Acireale
Torre di Manfria, Gela
Towers of Vendicari, Capo Passero and Punta delle Formiche in the province of Syracuse
Palazzo Baronale, Spadafora
Castello di Roccavaldina
Torre del Lauro, Caronia
Torre di Fuori, near Isola delle Femmine
Torre di San Giovanni, Torre di Roccazzo and Torre di Scopello in San Vito Lo Capo and Castellammare del Golfo
Reconstruction of the Castello di Milazzo, Milazzo
Torre Salsa, Siculiana
Torre di Carlo V, Porto Empedocle
Torre di Monterosso, Realmonte
Torre Sant'Angelo, Licata

Other works
Façade of the Church of St. John of Malta in Messina
Fontana della Flora in Villa Vittorio Emanuele, Caltagirone
He possibly worked on the Cathedral of Milazzo
two fonts for the Catania Cathedral
a Glauco for the Royal Palace of Palermo
sculptures for churches in Roccavaldina

References

16th-century births
1603 deaths
Architects from Florence
16th-century Italian architects
Italian military engineers
Sculptors from Tuscany